State Route 29 (SR 29) is an east–west state highway in the west-central portion of the U.S. state of Ohio. Its western terminus is at the Indiana state line near Celina, where State Road 67 continues west.  It continues east to St. Marys where it junctions with U.S. Route 33.  In that town, it also crosses State Route 66, State Route 116, and State Route 703, which was its former alignment before a divided highway was built.  After turning south it crosses State Route 219 in New Knoxville and then has an interchange with Interstate 75, continuing into Sidney where it meets State Route 47.  Still going southeast, it briefly joins State Route 235 before turning east and then south again to enter Urbana.  Here the route joins U.S. Route 36, and the concurrency intersects with U.S. Route 68 and State Route 54.  From there, State Route 29 leaves U.S. Route 36 and continues to Mutual, intersecting with State Route 161, and State Route 56 shortly after; later, in Mechanicsburg, the route intersects with State Route 4.  The route then intersects with State Route 38, U.S. Route 42, and Interstate 70 before reaching its eastern terminus at U.S. Route 40 on the western edge of West Jefferson.

History

1924 – Original route established.
1932 – The route was truncated at Urbana; alignment from Union City to Greenville designated as State Route 71; Greenville to Urbana designated as U.S. Route 36.
1939 – The route was extended to the Indiana state line along the former State Route 54 alignment (which was State Route 32 before 1938).
1973 – Divided highway alignment constructed from Celina to State Route 364 and freeway alignment constructed from State Route 364 to U.S. Route 33; former alignment designated State Route 703.

Major junctions

References

External links

029
Transportation in Mercer County, Ohio
Transportation in Auglaize County, Ohio
Transportation in Shelby County, Ohio
Transportation in Champaign County, Ohio
Transportation in Madison County, Ohio